Ardozyga glagera is a species of moth in the family Gelechiidae. It was described by Turner in 1919. It is found in Australia, where it has been recorded from Queensland.

The forewings are whitish, with pale ochreous-grey irroration which forms slender streaks along the fold, from the base of the costa through the disc to the apex, and along the costa. The hindwings are whitish.

References

Ardozyga
Moths described in 1919
Moths of Australia